The 1905 Alberta general election was the first general election held in the Province of Alberta, Canada on November 9, 1905, to elect twenty-five members of the Alberta legislature to the 1st Alberta Legislative Assembly, shortly after the province was created out of part of the Northwest Territories on September 1, 1905.

The Alberta Liberal Party led by Premier Alexander C. Rutherford won twenty-three of the twenty-five seats in the new legislature, defeating the Conservative Party, which was led by a young lawyer, Richard Bennett, who later served as Prime Minister of Canada. The election was held using the first past the post system. The number of seats won by the Liberals was far above its portion of the popular vote. The Liberal Party received a majority of the votes cast and received 92 percent of the seats. This was the last Alberta election to exclusively use single-winner first-past-the-post voting until 1959.

Prior to the 1905 election, the two political parties saw numerous changes and defections. In Alberta, a host of former Liberal-Conservative North-West Territories Assembly members jumped ship to the Liberals, when Sir Wilfrid Laurier appointed the Liberal provisional government prior to the election. The Conservatives had no strong leader to rally around at the time as Frederick Haultain had moved to the province of Saskatchewan, also just created out of part of the NWT.

Background

Government in the North-West Territories 
After Confederation in 1867, the new Dominion of Canada sought to expand westward and fulfil the provision of the British North America Act providing the option to admit Rupert's land to the Dominion. In that same year, Canada's Parliament expressed this desire to the United Kingdom and soon after entered into talks with the Hudson's Bay Company to arrange for the transfer of that Company's territory, Rupert's land.

After the Deed of Surrender was enacted, the United Kingdom transferred ownership of Rupert's Land and the North-Western Territory from the Hudson's Bay Company to the government of Canada. However, integration of the territories into Canadian Confederation was delayed by the Red River Rebellion around the Red River Colony. Eventually, the territories were admitted into Canadian Confederation on July 15, 1870, as the North-West Territories; barring the area around the Red River Colony, which was admitted into Canadian Confederation as the province of Manitoba.

The unelected Temporary North-West Council was formed under the Temporary Government Act, 1870, but the first appointments by the Government of Canada were delayed until November 28, 1872. The unelected body existed until October 1876 when it was replaced by the 1st Council of the North-West Territories, which consisted of appointed members, but with provisions for the election of members. A district of an area of  having 1,000 people could become an electoral district and elect one NWT Council member. This created a patchwork of unrepresented and represented areas (areas directly represented by an elected member), and there was no official or independent boundaries commission, all electoral law at the beginning was under the purview of the Lieutenant Governor. 

The boundary between Manitoba and the NWT was in flux for some years. The North-West Territories population grew considerably along the Manitoba border during the 1870s. This drove calls for franchise by settlers in the region, and many settlers expressed a desire to be incorporated into Manitoba. In 1880 three electoral districts were created in the North-West Territories, two of which bordered the province of Manitoba. The federal government heeded the calls of the settlers and expanded the borders of Manitoba westward on July 1, 1881, encompassing much of the densely populated areas of the Territories.

Starting in 1881, NWT began to acquire elected members. The first by-election occurred on March 23, 1881, in the Lorne district with Lawrence Clarke being elected to the Council. The election was conducted by voice vote, a qualified elector would tell the returning officer at a polling station who he was going to vote for and the results would be tallied. 

Under the terms of the Act, eligible electors were males who had reached the age of majority, which was 21 years of age at that time. The act specified that electors must be bona fide males who were not aliens or unenfranchised Indians. Electors must also have resided in the territory for at least 12 months to the day of the writ being dropped. The ad hoc by-election system continued to operate until 1888 when the Temporary North-West Council was replaced with elected, responsible government by the establishment of a Legislative Assembly selected in the 1888 North-West Territories general election. Robert Brett, the representative for the Red Deer district was appointed the Chairman of the Executive Committee, the defacto Premier of the North-West Territories.

Members at first were elected as non-partisan politicians, but some such as Frank Oliver were clearly members of a political party (Oliver was known to be a Liberal). The 1898 North-West Territories general election was a significant step toward party politics in the Territories as Frederick W. A. G. Haultain's Liberal-Conservative Party defeated Brett's Liberal Party to form government. The beginning of party politics in the Territories sparked controversy and was not done through any grassroots movement. It was done by Haultain in such a way that there was very little visibility to the public until years later after the party system began to mature.

Drive to provincehood 

The earliest calls for Alberta's provincial autonomy came from Robert Brett in 1896, when he proposed the formation of a new province from the District of Alberta and the District of Athabasca. However, Brett's proposal did not gain support and was opposed by Premier Haultain who preferred the Territories form one large province. In 1900, Haultain secured unanimous approval of a resolution asking the Government of Canada to inquire into the terms for provincial status of the Territories, and a year later Haultain and Arthur Sifton met with the federal cabinet and submitted a draft constitution for a new province in the North-West Territories. Wilfrid Laurier's government was not prepared to consider the proposals, concerned about the difficult questions surrounding religious education, the delegation of authority, and general apathy towards provincehood of Western Liberal Members of Parliament such as Frank Oliver.

The 1902 North-West Territories general election pressed the issue of provincehood. The Territories were under growing financial stress from limited revenue generation authorities while there was wave of immigration and population growth and rising demands for improved government infrastructure and services. Haultain's government was reelected in the chaotic and partisan 1902 election, although despite the divisions, the Assembly continued to agree that provincial autonomy was a pressing concern. During this time, Robert Borden, leader of the federal Conservative Party began to support provincehood for the Territories. Frustrated in negotiations with the federal Liberal government, Haultain became increasingly identified with the Conservative Party and campaigned for it in the 1904 federal election. Despite Haultain's influence, Laurier's Liberals were re-elected and captured 58 per cent of the vote in the North-West Territories.

Laurier had promised during the election that his government would address the issue of provincial status, and despite efforts by Frank Oliver to downplay the benefits of autonomy through his Edmonton newspaper the Bulletin, the Liberal government's Speech from the Throne to start the 10th Canadian Parliament committed the government to act on the question of autonomy. When the Autonomy Act split the North-West Territories along the
The federal government under Laurier believed that one single province would be too large to effectively manage, and the territory above the 60th parallel north was unfit for agriculture, and therefore had little hope of "thick and permanent settlement".

Terms of provincehood 

The federal government drafted a bill for consultation that established two new provinces, retained federal ownership of public lands and resources, and provided financial terms that historian Lewis Thomas described as "not ungenerous". 

However, the greatest opposition came with clauses providing education rights to minority faiths through separate schools with the right enshrined to establish schools and be provided public funds. The Laurier government a decade earlier had been embroiled in a similar controversial schools question in Manitoba, which resulted in the Laurier-Greenway compromise and the removal of minority school rights in Manitoba. The compromise was opposed by French-Canadians and the Catholic Church. The Haultain government had been engaged in a progressive reduction of the minority faith education privileges, with only eleven separate schools in operation by 1905. Minister of the Interior and the Western Liberal representative in Cabinet Clifford Sifton, who had been travelling away from Ottawa during the drafting of the bill returned to Ottawa to resign his portfolio in protest. Finance Minister William Stevens Fielding also considered resigning, but remained in cabinet. The education matter was highly controversial in English Canada, eliciting responses from Liberal newspapers and stoking fears for Liberal unity, however, in the Territories the issue was not seen as significant. Instead, the main issues with provincehood in the North-West Territories was the debate over the location of the new provincial capital and whether the federal government or province would have ownership of public lands and resources. The bill was amended to provide minority faiths with the right to separate schools that remained under provincial control. The bill retained federal control over public lands and natural resources and the provinces were promised $375,000 annually each with a provision for population growth.

The selection of the new provincial capital became the primary public issue. The finalized Alberta Act identified a "provisional" capital in Edmonton and provided the legislative assembly the authority to determine the final location of the capital. Calgary was in the advantageous position of having a slightly larger population and was located in a more densely populated part of the province. Edmonton had an advantage as the geographic center of the province and Frank Oliver's prominent voice in Laurier's cabinet. Furthermore, Member of Parliament for Strathcona Peter Talbot promised that he would "fight to the finish" to ensure the provisional capital was in either Edmonton or the neighbouring Strathcona.

The Alberta Act established electoral districts for the first provincial election. The final layout favoured northern Alberta with one additional district, despite Oliver and Talbot being aware that in the 1904 Territorial election there were 1,000 more votes cast south of the Red Deer River. Calgary Liberal Charles Stuart argued that a non-partisan commission would be best to establish the boundaries, but did not further press the creation of a commission when it became apparent the federal Liberals would not implement such a commission. Despite opposition from both Calgary Conservatives and Liberals, Oliver and Talbot continued to support the electoral boundaries favouring Northern Alberta, convincing Laurier to keep the draft boundaries in place.

Appointing a Lieutenant Governor and Premier 

The first election for the new provinces was scheduled to take place in November 1905, two months after Alberta and Saskatchewan entered Confederation. An appointed interim government was necessary to handle the affairs of the new provinces. Lieutenant Governor of the North-West Territories Amédée E. Forget was appointed as the first Lieutenant Governor of Saskatchewan while staunch Liberal George H. V. Bulyea a former member of the Territorial Legislature was appointed as the first Lieutenant Governor of Alberta. 

The choice for the first premier of Alberta was contentious. Frank Oliver was considered, but preferred the role of Minister of the Interior in Laurier's cabinet. Peter Talbot was also strongly considered by Laurier and other members of the Liberal Party for Alberta's first Premier. However, Talbot being of modest wealth believed that electoral politics was beyond his financial means, and instead sought a position in the Senate. Talbot got his wish and was appointed to the Senate in 1906. Historian Lewis Thomas believed that Laurier would have appointed Talbot the first Premier of Alberta if Talbot had shown any interest in the position.

The next candidate was Alexander Cameron Rutherford, the member of the North-West Territories Assembly for Strathcona. Laurier remained quiet and did not disclose his opinion on the decision, leading to some speculation in political circles. Speculation on the future Premier ended when Rutherford was named the leader of the Alberta Liberal Party on August 13, 1905, and a few days later Haultain announced that he would remain in Saskatchewan to form a provincial rights party. R. B. Bennett, a young Calgary lawyer was chosen as the leader of the Alberta Conservative Party a few days later on August 16, 1905. Historian Lewis Thomas argues that Laurier's decision to remain silent on naming a Premier helped weaken Haultain's position as the heir apparent in Alberta, and if Laurier had named Rutherford earlier, Haultain and his supporters of non-partisan government could have mounted a stronger protest and campaign. Laurier's appointment of staunch Liberals in Bulyea, Forget, Rutherford and Walter Scott ushered in party politics to the new prairie provinces.

On September 2, 1905, Bulyea in his first official act as Lieutenant Governor swore Rutherford in as Alberta's first premier, and the Liberal party formed Alberta's first provincial government.

Issues

Capital city 
Section 9 of the Alberta Act prescribed that the seat of government would be held in Edmonton, but provided authority to the Lieutenant Governor of Alberta to move the capital. Essentially, naming Edmonton as a temporary capital until a decision could be made by the elected provincial government.

The competition for the provincial capital was fierce between Calgary and Edmonton. At events in Edmonton, Liberal Attorney General Charles Wilson Cross assured the crowds that Edmonton would remain the capital, while his Conservative candidate William Antrobus Griesbach stated that all thirteen northern conservative candidates supported Edmonton as the capital. 

At the same time, Conservative leader Bennett told crowds in Calgary that if elected, his conservative government would establish the capital in Calgary. Bennett's Liberal opponent and Minister of Public Works William Henry Cushing pledged to bring the capital to Calgary, earning him the endorsement of the Calgary Albertan published by William McCartney Davidson. Meanwhile, the Calgary Herald opposed Cushing and argued that the federal liberals were "directed toward the destruction of that commercial and industrial supremacy" of Calgary, and accused the provincial liberals of being puppets of the federal party.

Residents of Red Deer made an effort to position the community as a compromise capital, located approximately halfway between the two competing cities. Although the small community and disinterest from federal elected officials hampered Red Deer's efforts for being considered a viable capital.

After the election resulted in an overwhelming Liberal majority, Premier Rutherford announced the location of the capital city was to be chosen by an open vote of the Legislature. The Calgary Board of Trade and newspapers recognizing the uphill battle to be named capital gave very little effort in rallying Calgarians and southern Albertans to the cause. Furthermore, Red Deer's elected member John Thomas Moore, who was chosen as the man "most likely to secure the capital", was largely ineffective as he left for the east after the election to attend to personal business. On April 25, 1906, Cushing made a motion in the Legislature to move the capital to Calgary, a second motion was made by Moore to move the capital to Red Deer. A vote was held to decide the issue of the capital, with eight members voting for Calgary and a majority 16 members voting for Edmonton.

Education 
After bitter debate across Canada, the proposed Alberta Act was amended by Laurier in second reading on March 22 and later passed by the 10th Canadian Parliament with provisions providing minority faiths with the right to separate schools under provincial control. Alberta conservatives rallied against the education provisions, but the party and leadership declined to make the repeal of the provisions an issue in the campaign. The Alberta liberals chose to campaign on accepting the decisions of parliament in regards to the schools issue, and instead focus on "an efficient system of public schools".

Campaign 
The writ for the election was issued on October 19, 1905, with the election scheduled to take place three weeks later on November 9. Liberal William Bredin was the only candidate acclaimed, with no contest necessary in the Athabasca.

Liberal 
Rutherford began his term as the appointed Premier by forming a cabinet inclusive of all the major regions of the province. Charles Wilson Cross of Medicine Hat was appointed Attorney General, William Henry Cushing of Calgary as Minister of Public Works, William Finlay of Edmonton as Minister of Agriculture, and Leverett George DeVeber of Lethbridge as Minister without a portfolio was added to cabinet.

The Liberal platform was adopted at the party convention in Calgary in October 1905. Recognizing the party was chosen to form government prior to the election, and the friendly relations with the Liberal federal government, the Liberal platform skirted mild and controversial issues. The issues of separate schools and public lands were not addressed, and instead, the convention noted an adherence to "the principle of Provincial rights" as the party policy. The Liberals instead sought an efficient system of public schools supported by taxation and regulated by the provincial government. The Liberals responded to conservative calls for public ownership of utilities by recognizing that public ownership was desirable and should be considered. The platform also advocated for the agricultural industry and was against incurring provincial debt.

The Liberal Party received support from the Calgary Albertan newspaper, as well as Oliver's Edmonton Bulletin.

Conservative 
With the exodus of Haultain to Saskatchewan, the Conservative movement was in desperate need of a new charismatic leader to face the incumbent Liberal party. Conservatives were able to find this leader in the young Calgary lawyer R. B. Bennett. The province was politically divided on geographic grounds, with Edmonton and northern Alberta leaning towards the Liberal Party, and Calgary and southern Alberta leaning more conservative. Calgary and southern Alberta's conservative-leaning was linked to the presence of the Canadian Pacific Railway which was generally regarded as exercising influence on behalf of the conservative movement.

The Conservative policy focused on protesting the decision of the federal government to retain public lands and resources, advocate for government-owned utilities such as telephone lines, and advocated for government construction and maintenance of roads and bridges. While Griesbach and Edmonton conservatives demanded Edmonton be named as the provincial capital, the Conservative party took no official position on the matter. The party did not take an official stance on the issue of separate schools for minority faiths being included in the Alberta Act, owing to the influence of Bennett and Senator James Lougheed. Although Bennett did make a speech decrying the federal government for including the separate school provisions in the Alberta Act, describing the decision as an attack on provincial rights. Historian Lewis Thomas describes the Conservative platform as being "defensive", lacking the initiative of the Liberal platform, and seeming almost non-partisan in nature.

The personality and character of Conservative leader Bennett became one of the central issues of the campaign. Liberal-leaning newspaper Edmonton Bulletin pointed out Bennett's employment as a solicitor for the Canadian Pacific Railway, Bell Telephone Company and Calgary Water Power Company, which was used to illustrate a "corporation connection" with Bennett and the Conservative party. Similar concerns were raised by the conservative-leaning Calgary Herald prior to Bennett's confirmation as leader. Historian Lewis Thomas describes the Liberal strategy to connect Bennett to the Canadian Pacific Railway as successful, noting many in Alberta resented the corporation for a myriad of reasons. Bennett did receive a surprising endorsement from Bob Edwards the publisher of the Calgary Eye-Opener, who had previously published stories critical of Bennett personally, and the Canadian Pacific Railway. Despite endorsing Bennett, Edwards contended that Bennett was a poor leader who sought "non-entities and spineless nincompoops as followers".

The Edmonton Bulletin ran several stories alleging corruption in the Conservative Party. This included a story accusing Calgary Conservative organizer William L. Walsh of attempting to bribe Daniel Maloney to run as a candidate in the St. Albert constituency.

Election

Electoral boundaries 
The boundaries of the electoral districts for the first Alberta general election were prescribed in the Alberta Act (Canada) and were a source of controversy with accusations of gerrymandering in favour of the Liberal Party and northern Alberta. Northern Alberta is thought by some to be over-represented. Calgary-based newspapers the Calgary Herald, Calgary Albertan, and Eye-Opener made claims that the borders constituted preferential treatment for Edmonton and northern Alberta. Prime Minister Laurier had received assurances that the distribution was fair from Alberta Members of Parliament Talbot and Oliver, but when word of Calgary's opposition reached Ottawa, Laurier summoned Talbot to explain the situation. On May 19, 1905, Talbot spent the morning convincing Laurier that the distribution was fair, Laurier agreed, but remained cautious and asked that the boundaries be submitted to a commission of judges for review. Laurier called a second meeting with Talbot on May 28 after receiving correspondence from Calgary Liberals but was once again put at ease with Talbot's explanation, and the concept of the judicial commission for review was likewise put to rest. 

Conservative Member of Parliament for Calgary Maitland Stewart McCarthy made no effort to advance Calgary and southern Alberta's claims for fair representation until June 20, 1905, much too late to make a difference. In the two-hour speech, McCarthy called for 15 seats in southern Alberta and 10 in northern Alberta and demanded a judicial commission to oversee the boundaries. However, McCarthy made no effort to participate in the early drafting process of the Alberta Act, instead hoping for an invitation to participate, one which never came from Oliver, the brunt of his efforts came too late in the drafting process.

The question of whether there was population-based gerrymandering returns different responses. Historian Lewis Thomas notes the final layout favoured northern Alberta with one additional district, despite Oliver and Talbot being aware that more than 1,000 more voters south of the Red Deer River participated in the 1904 Territorial election. Alexander Bruce Kilpatrick notes that the census results from 1906 show that if the 38th township is chosen as the dividing line (City of Red Deer), there were 93,601 persons in northern Alberta and 87,381 in southern Alberta, with an additional 4,430 residing in the 38th township. Kilpatrick claims that people misconstrued where the population of the Strathcona census district lived, assuming most were south of the 38th Township when a significant majority were in fact north of the township.

Kilpatrick however, describes the layout of the electoral districts as a "blatant manipulation of the electoral map to suit a particular purpose". In particular, Kilpatrick claims that Oliver designed the constituencies to maximize the influence of Edmonton, the borders did not align with the previous constituencies from the North-west Territories legislature, and instead were drawn to have several ridings touching the city's borders. At the same time, Calgary did not have the same advantages in design and was reduced from two seats in the North-west Territories Legislature to one in the new Alberta Legislature. Calgary was given an additional member before the next provincial election.

Voting and eligibility 

Voter and candidate eligibility requirements remained in place under the rules set by the North-West Legislative Assembly under The Territories Elections Ordinance. The right to vote was provided to male British subjects who were 21 years of age or older and had resided in the North-West Territories for at least 12 months, and the electoral district for the three months prior to the vote. The vote took place on November 9, 1905, with polls open between 9:00 a.m. and 5:00 p.m.

In 1905 Albertans would vote by marking an "X" on a blank sheet of paper using a coloured pencil which corresponded to the candidate whom they wished to vote for, red for Liberal and blue for Conservative. Scrutineers were able to contest the eligibility of a person voting, the voter would then be required to fill out a form with their information which would be deposited in an envelope along with their ballot. The voter would then be required to return within two days to contest the objection to a Justice of the Peace.

Irregularities

Calgary 

The election in 1905 was a bitter one, especially in Calgary and Southern Alberta where the Liberals were accused of vote tampering and interfering with Conservative voters. Recounts especially in Calgary took almost a month and saw the result swing back and forth. The scandal led to the arrest of some key Liberal organizers, including William Henry Cushing's campaign manager, who had been a returning officer at a Calgary polling station. A liberal organizer was convicted of bribery for paying a voter $10 not to defend his ballot which was challenged during the count. The Calgary contest was eventually called for Cushing with a margin of 37 votes.

Peace River 

The Peace River electoral district was contested between Liberal James Cornwall and Independent Lucien Dubuc. Dubec received the greater number of votes, but the election results were overturned by the Executive Council in mid-January due to significant irregularities, leaving the seat vacant. A new election was held on February 15, 1906. An appeal was launched into the legality of Cabinet deciding on the legitimacy of an election, which was upheld when Judge David Lynch Scott found the court had no jurisdiction unless delegated by the legislature.

Thomas Brick declared his candidacy in the new election for the Liberals after being asked to run by a large group of people who appeared at his homestead. He faced James Cornwall who attempted to re-win his seat and he also ran under the Liberal banner. The runner-up candidate from the original 1905 election Conservative candidate Lucien Dubuc did not run again leaving a rare two-way race under the same party banner. Thomas Brick defeated James Cornwall in a landslide.

Aftermath 

The Liberal Party under Premier Rutherford dominated the election capturing 22 of the 25 available seats in a landslide victory, while Bennett's Conservative Party captured a mere two seats and Bennett himself was not successful in Calgary. The Liberals were confident that they would form a majority government prior to the election, but had not expected so many seats. Liberal MP Talbot estimated the Liberals would capture 18 seats. The Conservatives did not expect the defeat, being successful in nominating candidates in 22 of the 25 ridings and having entrenched support in southern Alberta. The conservatives attributed their defeat to the Roman Catholic vote which was felt to be sympathetic to Laurier for his support of separate schools, with Bennett himself attributing his loss in Calgary to Roman Catholic influences, the labour vote and his time travelling outside of the district. Bennett quickly resigned from his position as leader and temporarily retired from politics. Conservatives also attributed the loss to non-Anglo-Saxon voters. However, the Conservative victories by Cornelius Hiebert in Rosebud and Albert Robertson in High River went against this trend. Hiebert, a Russian-born Mennonite, won in his constituency, while Robertson was aided by a third candidate syphoning votes from the incumbent Liberal opponent.

Historian Lewis Thomas argues the Liberal landslide was due to the incumbent position of the Liberal government which in its two months had not been tested with scandal or policy, making it difficult for effective opposition and criticism, all the while being able to maintain all the powers of patronage an incumbent would have. The Liberals effectively exercised the machinery of government from both the provincial and federal levels, with Thomas noting a few surviving written suggestions for Liberal appointments. Furthermore, Thomas argues the strong positions taken by the Conservative Party on the provincial right to control the school system and public lands did not make a significant impression on voters.

Results

Full results
 and the 1906 by-election in Peace River
|- style="text-align:center;background-color:#e9e9e9"
! rowspan="2" colspan="2" style="text-align:left;" | Party
! rowspan="2" style="text-align:left;" | Party leader
! rowspan="2" | Candidates
! colspan="2" | Seats
! colspan="2" | Popular vote
|- style="text-align:center;background-color:#e9e9e9"
| 1905
| style="font-size:80%" | % seats
| style="font-size:80%" | Votes
| style="font-size:80%" |%
|-

| style="text-align:left;" |Alexander Cameron Rutherford
| 26
| 22
| 88%
| 14,078
| 55.95%
|-

| style="text-align:left;" |R. B. Bennett
| 22
| 2
| 8%
| 9,342
| 37.13%
|-

| style="text-align:left;" colspan="2" |Independent and no affiliation
| 7
| 1
| 4%
| 1,743
| 6.92%
|-
| colspan="3" style="text-align:left;" |Total
|56
|25
|100%
|25,163
|100%
|-
| style="text-align:left;" colspan="8" | Source: A Report on Alberta Elections 1905-1982 (Edmonton:  Provincial Archives of Alberta, 1983)Alberta Advocate November 17, 1905
|}

Members of the Legislative Assembly elected 
For complete electoral history, see individual districts

(for the Peace River district results, see above)

See also
 List of Alberta political parties

Notes

References

Works cited

 
 
 
 
 
 
 

1905 elections in Canada
1905
November 1905 events
1905 in Alberta